This is a list of butterflies that can be found in Nebraska. This list is in alphabetical order.

References

Nebraska
Butterflies